

Literature and comics
 The Park (play), a 1983 play by Botho Strauß
 The Park, a comic strip in the British comic Buster

Films
 The Park (2003 film) (Chow lok yuen), a 2003 horror film directed by Lau Wai Keung
 The Park (2007 film), a 2007 Chinese film

Games
 The Park (video game), a psychological horror experience game

Places
 The Park at MOA, an amusement park at Mall of America (MOA), in Bloomington, Minnesota, United States
 The Park (Woodlands), the centrepiece of the Woodlands model village in South Yorkshire, England
 The Park Estate, a residential estate in Nottingham, England
 The Park, Burley-on-the-Hill, a cricket venue in Rutland, England
 The Park Hotels, an Indian hotel chain
 Plymouth-Canton Educational Park, a high school campus in Michigan, United States
 Skye (Charlotte), formerly The Park, a 22-story hotel/condominium tower in Charlotte, North Carolina, United States

See also

 Park (disambiguation)
 Park Hotel (disambiguation)
 The Parks, a parkland area and cricket venue in Oxford, England